FK Budućnost Valjevo is a defunct football club based in Valjevo, Serbia.

History
The original club was founded as SK Sloga in 1920. They were, however, banned by the authorities after just a year. In 1925, the club continued its activities as RSK Valjevo and was led by some founding members of the previous club. Their first recorded game occurred in 1926. In 1929, the club changed its name to FK Budućnost. They became members of the Belgrade Football Subassociation in 1930.

In 1959, the club merged with FK Radnički to form FK Metalac. They earned promotion to the Yugoslav Second League in 1969. In 1971, the club changed its name back to FK Budućnost. They spent two more seasons in the second tier of Yugoslav football.

After the breakup of Yugoslavia, the club won the Serbian League West in 1993–94 and subsequently the Second League of FR Yugoslavia in 1995–96 to reach the First League of FR Yugoslavia. They competed in the I/B League for two seasons (1996–97 and 1997–98).

In July 2014, after three unsuccessful seasons in the Drina Zone League, the club was controversially merged with local rivals FK Krušik to create FK Budućnost Krušik 2014.

Honours
Second League of FR Yugoslavia (Tier 2)
 1995–96
Serbian League West / Serbian League Danube (Tier 3)
 1993–94 / 2001–02

Notable players
This is a list of players who have played at full international level.
  Milivoje Ćirković
  Nikola Lazetić
  Slobodan Santrač
For a list of all FK Budućnost Valjevo players with a Wikipedia article, see :Category:FK Budućnost Valjevo players.

Managerial history

References

External links
 Club page at Srbijasport

1920 establishments in Serbia
2014 disestablishments in Serbia
Association football clubs disestablished in 2014
Association football clubs established in 1920
Defunct football clubs in Serbia
Football clubs in Yugoslavia
Sport in Valjevo